Thomas or Tom Proctor may refer to:

 Thomas Proctor (general) (1739–1806), American soldier and politician 
 Thomas F. Proctor (born 1956), American trainer of Thoroughbred racehorses
 Tom Proctor (actor), American actor
 Tom Proctor (trade unionist) (1855–1925), British trade unionist and Labour Party politician
 Tom Proctor, a fictional character in the British television series The Bill

See also
 Thomas R. Proctor High School, located in Utica, New York
 Proctor (surname)